Urania was a torpedo cruiser of the  built for the Italian Regia Marina (Royal Navy) in the 1880s. She was built by the Cantieri navali Odero shipyard; her keel was laid in February 1889, she was launched in June 1891, and was commissioned in July 1893. Her main armament were her six torpedo tubes, which were supported by a battery of ten small-caliber guns. Urania spent most of her career in the main Italian fleet, where she was primarily occupied with training exercises. She was still in service at the outbreak of the Italo-Turkish War in September 1911, but she did not take part in any operations. Instead, she remained in Italian waters and was broken up for scrap in January 1912.

Design

The Partenope-class cruisers were derivatives of the earlier, experimental s, themselves based on the preceding cruiser . The doctrine emphasized the use of small, torpedo-armed craft to destroy expensive ironclads.

She displaced  normally. The ship had a short forecastle deck that terminated at the conning tower. She had a crew of between 96 and 121 personnel.

Her propulsion system consisted of a pair of horizontal triple-expansion steam engines, each driving a single screw propeller. Steam was supplied by four coal-fired locomotive boilers, which were vented through two widely spaced funnels.

Urania was armed with a main battery of one  /40 gun placed on the forecastle. Close-range defense against torpedo boats was provided by a secondary battery of six  /43 guns mounted singly. She was also equipped with three  /20 guns in single mounts. Her primary offensive weapon was her six  torpedo tubes.

Service history
Urania was laid down on 16 February 1889 at the Cantieri navali Odero (Odero Shipyard) in Genoa, and was launched on 18 June 1891. After fitting-out work was completed, the ship was commissioned into the fleet on 21 July 1893. During the 1893 fleet maneuvers, Urania served with the 2nd Division of the Reserve Squadron, along with the ironclad , the protected cruiser , and four torpedo boats. During the maneuvers, which lasted from 6 August to 5 September, the ships of the Reserve Squadron defended against a simulated attack by the Active Squadron, which gamed a French attack on the Italian fleet. In 1895, Urania was stationed in the 2nd Maritime Department, split between Taranto and Naples, along with most of the torpedo cruisers in the Italian fleet.

The ship was assigned to the 2nd Division of the main fleet in 1897, initially along with the three s and the protected cruisers  and Stromboli. The 2nd Division was usually kept in reserve, which amounted to three months of active service per year, with the rest of the time spent in harbor with reduced crews. At the start of the Italo-Turkish War in September 1911, Urania was stationed in Italy, alternating between the ports of La Spezia and Naples, along with her sister ships Iride and Caprera. She did not see action during the war. In January 1912, with the war still on-going, the ship was sold for scrap and thereafter broken up.

Footnotes

Notes

Citations

References

External links
 Urania Marina Militare website

1891 ships
Partenope-class cruisers
Ships built in Genoa